Ice Cream Genius is the title of the first solo album by Steve Hogarth, singer of Marillion. It was originally released in 1997 on When! Recordings. It was released in North America in August 1998 with a different artwork and with the extra track "The Last Thing".

Background
Recording commenced at the Racket Club, and the vocals were added at Chris Rea's Sol Mill studios in Cockham. Mixing took place at the Woolhall Studios in Somerset, owned by Van Morrison. There was a break for Marillions Made Again tour in April 1996, and Ice Cream Genius was finally completed on 20 July 1996. Hogarth said in an interview 1997 :
Hogarth said in the Web UK Magazine 1996: 

It was the producer Leon who decided to not put the track "The Last Thing" on the first edition of the album.

Hogarth said in The Web UK Magazine 1996 about each track:

The Evening Shadows: It's about a little creature that wakes up at night and wreaks havoc. It's a bit like Lucy in the Sky of Diamonds, meeting Syd Barret in a dark alley.
Really Like: It's a white afro-funk number. A combination of rhythm box and real percussion by Brazilian Luis Jardim.
You Dinosaur Thing: This is a sixtiesish homage to old rockers. We are old rockers in someone's eyes. About the fashion aspect in music and being "past it" before you've even got started. Everyone who's heard it thinks it's about Oasis...but it's all about us.
The Deep Water: This is a poem set to music. It's a poem about my own death and my own love. The music is like a movie, very visual and ambient. But at the end the water runs dry to Desert and the song turns from ambient to rhythmic. It goes Arabic and a little like the Doors.
Cage: A song about staring at a cage...and being inside one. It's about waiting for a letter...or waiting for the phone to ring.
Until You Fall: A sort of Velvet Underground and a Lou Reed verse with an XTC chorus. At this stage this chorus is one of my favourites.
Better Dreams: Los Angeles for the first time. How it struck me. I remember getting into a lift and when the doors closed I realised it was just me and Debbie Harry. Then it stopped and she got out and Little Richard got in...It's a freedom story, just voice and strings with a sprinkle of ambient guitar and flute.
Nothing To Declare: We used to live near Heathrow Airport and I used to watch the 747's climbing up over my house and wonder where they were going. I often thought it must be somewhere warmer and more exciting than rainy old England. I wrote the lyrics back then.

Track listing

Personnel
Steve Hogarth - vocals, piano, samples and machines
Dave Gregory – guitars 
Chucho Merchan – bass 
Richard Barbieri – synthesizers
Clem Burke - drums
Luis Jardim - percussion

Additional personnel
Steve Jansen – percussion
Stuart Gordon – strings
Craig Leon – 12 string cloud on "Until You Fall"
Eddie Thornton - trumpet
Brian Edwards - saxophone
Trevor Edwards - trombone
Tim Weather - flute
Cassel Webb, Stuart Epps  - backing vocals

Production
Produced and mixed by Craig Leon
Co-produced by Steve Hogarth
Engineered by Stewart Every
Additional engineering by Michael Hunter, Stuart Epps

References

External links
marillion.com
AllMusic

1997 albums